I with diaeresis (Ӥ ӥ; italics: Ӥ ӥ) is a letter of the Cyrillic script. This letter is the Cyrillic letter I (Ии) by adding a mečlatjel (мечлатjел) on top.

Computing codes

See also
И и : Cyrillic letter I
Ї ї : Cyrillic letter Yi
Ï ï :  Latin letter I with diaeresis
Cyrillic characters in Unicode

References

Cyrillic letters with diacritics
Letters with diaeresis